Denis Lill (born 22 April 1942) is a New Zealand-born British actor. He is best known for his roles in Survivors as Charles Vaughan, Only Fools and Horses as Alan Parry, Outside Edge as Dennis Broadley and as Consultant General Surgeon Mr Rose in the ITV1 medical drama The Royal.

Career 
Lill joined the RNZAF as a 13–course BES cadet entrant in 1959. It was in the RNZAF that he first expressed an interest in amateur dramatics and a fondness for mimicking characters of the BBC's The Goon Show. Throughout his air force career, he involved himself in operatic and theatric productions. He left New Zealand for Britain in 1967.

Some of his many film and television roles include Fall of Eagles (1974), Special Branch (1974 series 4,ep12), Edward the Seventh (1975), Survivors (1975–77), The Eagle Has Landed (1976), Bad Blood (1981), The Scarlet Pimpernel (1982), as William Knox D'Arcy, the Australian oil pioneer in Persia, in Reilly: Ace of Spies (1983), Rumpole of the Bailey (1983–92), Mapp and Lucia (1985–86), Only Fools and Horses (1989–92), Batman, Red Dwarf (1 episode, 1990s) (1989), Bernard and the Genie (1991), Richard III (1995), Evita (1996), The Opium War (1997), Rebecca (1997) Heartbeat (2002) and The Royal (2003-2011).

Lill twice appeared in the BBC's science fiction series Doctor Who: as Dr Fendelman in the 1977 serial Image of the Fendahl and as Sir George Hutchinson in 1984's The Awakening. After a one-off appearance in the first series of Terry Nation's post-apocalyptic drama Survivors as Charles Vaughan, he became the leading actor for the show's second and third series. Lill portrayed Bertie, the Prince of Wales and later Edward the VII, in the 1978 period serial drama  Lillie opposite Francesca Annis as Lillie Langtry. In 1980 he appeared in the role of Josef Merhart, a member of an organised crime syndicate involved in a silver bullion robbery in the hard-hitting British police drama The Professionals; the episode titled  "Hijack".
  
In the 1990s he appeared in sitcoms Outside Edge as Dennis Broadley and Only Fools and Horses as Cassandra's father, Alan Parry.

Lill appeared in the 1986 Sherlock Holmes adaptation of The Man with the Twisted Lip as Inspector Bradstreet, a character he played in two further Holmes adventures in 1988 & 1994. He also appeared as the drunken MP Sir Talbot Buxomly who died onscreen in an episode of Blackadder the Third and as the Beadle in Blackadder's Christmas Carol. He also appeared as Sir Reuben Astwell in "The Underdog" (1993) of the detective series Poirot. He appeared in Red Dwarf, playing a rogue simulant in "Gunmen of the Apocalypse", in Bertie and Elizabeth as Clement Attlee (2002) and from 2003 until 2011 Lill starred in the ITV1 drama The Royal as Consultant General Surgeon Mr. Rose. Lill has also worked in radio theatre with one of his memorable characters being the brother in Ron Blair's play The Christian Brothers. In 2014, he appeared in 24: Live Another Day.

In February 2016, Lill appeared in series 18 episode 4 " A Dying Art" of the ITV crime drama Midsomer Murders.

Lill appeared in Series 2 Episode 5 of "Shakespeare and Hathaway: Private Investigators" in March 2019.

Personal life 
Lill resides in Ryme Intrinseca, Dorset, with his wife Vanessa. They have two children.

Selected filmography

References

External links

1942 births
Living people
New Zealand male film actors
New Zealand male television actors
People from Hamilton, New Zealand
New Zealand emigrants to the United Kingdom
Royal New Zealand Air Force personnel
New Zealand expatriates in England